Philip Gurdon (26 June 1800 – 1 August 1874) was an English first-class cricketer who played for Norfolk and Cambridge University. He is recorded in two matches, totalling 16 runs with a highest score of 9.

Gurdon was educated at Eton College, then went up to Trinity College, Cambridge, but after two years he moved to Downing College. After graduating he was ordained as a Church of England priest and was rector of parishes in Norfolk near his family's home at Letton Hall from 1825 until his death in 1874. He held the following appointments:

 Rector, Reymerston 1825–1874
 Rector, Southburgh 1828–1874
 Rector, Hatton 1829
 Rector, Cranworth with Letton, 1832–1874

Works 
A Selection of Psalms and Hymns compiled from different authors fot the use of his parishoners, by the Rector of Cranworth, in Norfolk (East Dereham: H. C. Wigg). 1849; second ed. 1851

References

Bibliography
 

1800 births
1874 deaths
People educated at Eton College
Alumni of Downing College, Cambridge
People from Breckland District
Church of England priests
English cricketers of 1787 to 1825
Norfolk cricketers
Cambridge University cricketers
Sportspeople from Norfolk

18th-century Anglican priests
19th-century Anglican priests
Anglican hymnwriters